This is a list of television game shows that were franchised and adapted in different versions.

References

Lists of media franchises
Franchises
Television lists